was a Japanese TV anime staple that showcased an animated version of a different classical book or story each year from 19:30 to 20:00 on Sunday on Fuji TV. It originally aired from 1969 to 1997 and from 2007 to 2009.

History
The first several series were produced by Mushi Production and then by Zuiyo Eizo, and then by Zuiyo's division Nippon Animation, which was officially established in June 1975 during the run of A Dog of Flanders. In both cases, the series originally aired primarily on Fuji TV. Hayao Miyazaki and Isao Takahata both worked on several of the series. World Masterpiece Theater as produced by Nippon Animation lasted for 23 seasons, from A Dog of Flanders in 1975 to Remi, Nobody's Girl (家なき子レミ, Ie Naki Ko Remi, Sans Famille) in 1997. Nippon Animation restarted the series in 2007 with the release of Les Misérables: Shōjo Cosette, which premiered on BS Fuji on 7 January 2007, with Porufi no Nagai Tabi (The Long Journey of Porphy) subsequently airing on the same network beginning on 6 January 2008, making it the 25th World Masterpiece Theater series. The most recent and 26th series is Kon'nichiwa Anne: Before Green Gables (lit. Hello Anne ~ Before Green Gables).

To date, only seven series were ever dubbed in English for the North American market: Fables of the Green Forest (1973), Tom Sawyer (1980), Swiss Family Robinson (1981), Little Women (1987), The Adventures of Peter Pan (1989), The Bush Baby (1992), and Tico & Friends (1994). The anime satellite television network, Animax, who also aired numerous installments of the series across Japan, later translated and dubbed many of the series' installments into English for broadcast across its English-language networks in Southeast Asia and South Asia, such as Princess Sarah (小公女セーラ, Shōkōjo Sēra), Remi, Nobody's Girl (家なき子レミ, Ie Naki Ko Remi), Little Women (愛の若草物語, Ai no Wakakusa Monogatari), and others. The serials also found success in Europe, with Anne of Green Gables (1979), Miyazaki's last work for Nippon Animation before leaving the studio), Heidi, Girl of the Alps, as well as the aforementioned Princess Sarah.

The series has been known by various names over the years (as shown below), but "the World Masterpiece Theater" is the name most commonly used by viewers. Nippon Animation's official English name for the series is "The Classic Family Theater Series".

The sponsorship of this series has changed several times, the first was Calpis alone (1969–1978), the second was House Foods alone (1986–1993, 2007–2008).

Starting in 2017 Amazon Prime Video made various series available in HD quality, but cropped for 16:9 displays in the US and UK markets. However Amazon did not use the "World Masterpiece Theater" label and only kept the subtitle for each series.

Features

The World Masterpiece Theater has the following features.

 The main character's family environment is an orphan or a single-parent family. The main character loses either or both father and mother.
 The main theme is family, and the influence of a deceased parent remains until the end.
 An animal character appears.
 The stage is set in a real city.
 The era is set between the 19th century and the end of World War II.
 No Prince or Princess was added. (After Andersen Stories ended.)
As these backgrounds, the time when this series was broadcast (1975–1997), it was common that TV was possessed by "one per a family", anime which are easy to put regardless of age were preferred, and were oriented for family. Videos became widespread in Japan in the late 1980s, and the time that TV was possessed by "one per a person" became common is after the Cold War (since 1992).

As an exception to the above, the double-parents family is Tales of Little Women (1987), the fictional world is The Adventures of Peter Pan (1989), and the work set after the World War II and without the original novel is Tico of the Seven Seas (1994).

Companion volume
Apart from Fuji TV, there was also a companion volume of the World Masterpiece Theater, which was broadcast on TV Tokyo from 19:30 to 20:00 on Thursday. This is sponsored by Sumitomo Electric Industries alone, but it is characterized by the theme of a specific field rather than the family. Moero! Top Striker (1991) and Jeanie with the Light Brown Hair (1992) are works of this companion volume.

Recurring casts
The following people frequently appeared in the World Masterpiece Theater, including the companion volume on TV Tokyo.

Director
 Kōzō Kusuba
 Yoshio Kuroda : Other than the director, he also worked on storyboards and series composition, for example.
 Sound director
 Etsuji Yamada
 Voice actor
 Eiko Yamada
 Mitsuko Horie
 Keiko Han
 Rihoko Yoshida
 Taeko Nakanishi
 Yoshiko Matsuo
 Ai Orikasa
 Kazue Ikura
 Ogata Ken'ichi

Productions

Before Nippon Animation – Calpis Comic Theater (1969–1974)
Note: These are the only series that are not included into the World Masterpiece Theater franchise.
 , 26 episodes: Adapted from the manga Dororo by the Japanese manga artist Osamu Tezuka. The only series in black and white.
 , 65 episodes: Adapted from the Moomin books by the Finnish author Tove Jansson.
 , 52 episodes：Adapted from several stories by Hans Christian Andersen, the Danish fairy tale writer.
 , 52 episodes: A remake of the 1969–1970 Moomin series, based more closely on the books.
 , 52 episodes：Adapted from the stories of animal-themed children's writer, Thornton Burgess.
 , 52 episodes：Adapted from Heidi by Johanna Spyri.

Nippon Animation – Calpis Children's Theater (1975–1977)
Note: These are the 26 official entries of the World Masterpiece Theater franchise.
 , 52 episodes：Adapted from the novel of the same name by Maria Louise Ramé (aka Ouida).
 , 52 episodes：Adapted from a small part of Heart, the chapter named "From the Apennines to the Andes", written by Italian author Edmondo De Amicis.
 , 52 episodes：Adapted from Rascal by Sterling North.

Calpis Family Theater (1978)
 , 53 episodes：Adapted from En Famille by Hector Malot.

World Masterpiece Theater (1979–1985; no title sponsor)
 , 50 episodes：Adapted from the novel of the same name by Lucy Maud Montgomery.
 , 49 episodes：Adapted from the novel of the same name by Mark Twain.
 , 50 episodes：Adapted from The Swiss Family Robinson by Johann David Wyss.
 , 50 episodes：Adapted from the Australian novel Southern Rainbow by Phyllis Piddington.
 , 48 episodes：Adapted from the English children book, Treasures of the Snow by Patricia St. John.
 , 49 episodes：Adapted from the Finnish novel Paimen, piika ja emäntä by Auni Nuolivaara.
 , 46 episodes：Adapted from A Little Princess by Frances Hodgson Burnett.

House Foods World Masterpiece Theater (1986–1993)
 , 51 episodes： Adapted from Pollyanna and Pollyanna Grows Up, by Eleanor H. Porter.
 , 48 episodes：Adapted from Little Women by Louisa May Alcott.
 , 43 episodes：Adapted from Frances Hodgson Burnett's novel, Little Lord Fauntleroy.
 , 41 episodes：Adapted from J. M. Barrie's play and novel, Peter Pan, or The Boy Who Wouldn't Grow Up and Peter and Wendy.
 , 40 episodes：Adapted from Daddy-Long-Legs by Jean Webster.
 , 40 episodes：Adapted from The Story of the Trapp Family Singers by Maria Augusta von Trapp, which also inspired the musical The Sound of Music and its film version.
 , 40 episodes：Adapted from The Bushbabies by William Stevenson.
 , 40 episodes： Adapted from Little Women'''s sequel, Little Men by Louisa May Alcott.

World Masterpiece Theater (1994–1997; no title sponsor)
 , 39 episodes: An original story.
 , 33 episodes：Adapted from Die schwarzen Brüder by Kurt Held (published under the name of his wife Lisa Tetzner).
 , 26 episodes: Adapted from the short story Lassie Come-Home by Eric Knight.
 , 26 episodes: Adapted from Sans Famille by Hector Malot.

House Foods World Masterpiece Theater (2007–2008)
 , 52 episodes：Adapted from Les Misérables by Victor Hugo.
 , 52 episodes: Adapted from The Orphans of Simitra by Paul-Jacques Bonzon.

 World Masterpiece Theater (2009) 
 , 39 episodes：Adapted from the Anne of Green Gables prequel, Before Green Gables by Budge Wilson.

 Feature films 
Two additional theatrical feature films remake were produced as part of the franchise:

 The Dog of Flanders: The Movie (劇場版 フランダースの犬, Gekijōban Furandāsu no Inu, 1997)
 Marco: 3000 Leagues in Search of Mother (Marco 母をたずねて三千里, Maruko Haha o Tazunete Sanzenri, 1999)
Re-edited footage films of Heidi, Girl of the Alps, 3000 Leagues in Search of Mother, The Story of Perrine and Anne of Green Gables were also released in theater in Japan over the years. Susbequently, every series of the franchise received a re-edited footage OVA released on DVD by Bandai and later broadcast as TV Specials.

 See also 
 Animated Classics of Japanese Literature Hallmark Hall of Fame''

References

External links 
 Official website
 
 Official Facebook Page

 
Nippon Animation
1960s Japanese television series
1970s Japanese television series
1980s Japanese television series
1990s Japanese television series
2010s Japanese television series
1969 Japanese television series debuts
1997 Japanese television series endings
2007 Japanese television series debuts
2009 Japanese television series endings